The 1996 United States Senate election in Texas was held on November 5, 1996. Incumbent Republican U.S. Senator Phil Gramm won re-election to a third term.

Major candidates

Democratic 
 Victor Morales, Teacher, Navy veteran
John Bryant, Incumbent U.S representative
Jim Chapman, Incumbent U.S representative
John Odam, State Supreme Court litigator

Republican 
 Phil Gramm, incumbent U.S. Senator
 Henry Grover, former state senator

Campaign
Morales, who never ran for public office before, pulled a major upset in the primary by defeated three politicians: U.S. Congressman John Wiley Bryant, U.S. Congressman Jim Chapman, and former State Supreme Court litigator John Odam. In the March run-off, he defeated Bryant with 51% of the vote. He became the first minority in Texas history to become a United States Senate nominee from either major party. Despite having no staff, raising only $15,000, and not accepting any special interest money he obtained 2.5 million votes.

Gramm previously ran for President earlier in the year, but lost to fellow U.S. Senator Bob Dole in the Republican presidential primary. Gramm was the heavy favorite. A September poll showed Gramm leading 50% to 40%. A late October poll showed him leading with 53% to 31%.

Exit Polls showed that Gramm performed well with Anglos (68% to 31%), while Morales won African Americans (79% to 19%) and Latinos (79% to 20%) respectively.

Results

See also 
 1996 United States Senate elections

References 

Texas
1996
1996 Texas elections